Molly Stark State Park is a 148-acre state park in Wilmington, Vermont. The park is named for Molly Stark, the famous wife of General John Stark of the American Revolutionary War, and is located along the Molly Stark Byway.

Activities includes camping, hiking, picnicking, mountain biking, wildlife watching, and winter sports. There is a loop hiking trail up to the fire lookout tower on Mt. Olga.

Facilities include a 23 tent/RV sites and 11 lean-to sites, flush toilets, hot showers, a play area and large pavilion with electricity, 3 charcoal grills, and 10 picnic tables.

References

External links
Official website

State parks of Vermont
Protected areas of Bennington County, Vermont
Woodford, Vermont
1960 establishments in Vermont